The 2000–01 FA Premier League (known as the FA Carling Premiership for sponsorship reasons) was the ninth FA Premier League season and the third season running which ended with Manchester United as champions and Arsenal as runners-up. Sir Alex Ferguson became the first manager to win three successive English league titles with the same club. Liverpool, meanwhile, managed a unique cup treble – winning the FA Cup, League Cup and UEFA Cup. They also finished third in the Premier League and qualified for the Champions League. Nike replaced Mitre as manufacturer of the official Premier League match ball, a contract that has since been extended multiple times, with the most recent renewal made in November 2018 to the end of the 2024–25 season.

UEFA Cup places went to Leeds United, Chelsea, Ipswich Town, and Aston Villa, who qualified via the Intertoto Cup. None of the top six clubs in the Premier League had an English manager. The most successful English manager in the 2000–01 Premier League campaign was Peter Reid, whose Sunderland side finished seventh, having spent most of the season challenging for a place in Europe, and briefly occupied second place in the Premier League table.

Despite the success achieved by Sir Alex Ferguson and Gérard Houllier, the Manager of the Year Award went to George Burley. The Ipswich Town manager was in charge of a newly promoted side who began the season as relegation favourites and on a limited budget, guided his team to fifth place in the Premier League final table earning a total of 66 points - the highest total in Premier League history for a newly promoted side since the switch to a 20-team format—and a place in the UEFA Cup for the first time in almost 20 years. 2000–01 was perhaps the best season yet for newly promoted teams in the Premier League. Charlton Athletic finished ninth, their highest finish since the 1950s. The only newly promoted team to suffer relegation was Manchester City, who in the space of six seasons had now been relegated three times and promoted twice. Relegated in bottom place were Bradford City, whose return to the top division after almost 80 years was over after just two seasons. The next relegation place went to Coventry City, who were finally relegated after 34 successive seasons of top division football, which had brought numerous relegation battles and league finishes no higher than sixth place.

Teams
Twenty teams competed in the league – the top seventeen teams from the previous season and the three teams promoted from the First Division. The promoted teams were Charlton Athletic, Manchester City and Ipswich Town, returning after a top flight absence of one, four and five years respectively. They replaced Wimbledon, Sheffield Wednesday and Watford. They were relegated after spending fourteen, nine and one year in the top flight respectively.

Stadiums and locations

Personnel and kits
(as of 14 May 2001)

 1 The Dreamcast logo appeared on Arsenal's home and third shirts while the Sega logo appeared on their away shirt.

Managerial changes

League table

Results

Season statistics

Scoring

Top scorers

Hat-tricks 

Note: 4 Player scored 4 goals; P Player scored a perfect hat-trick; (H) – Home; (A) – Away

Top assists

Awards

Monthly awards

Annual awards

References

External links
League and cup results for all the 2000/01 Premier Division clubs at footballsite
2000–01 FA Premier League Season at RSSSF

 
Premier League seasons
Eng
1